Prince Philip is a 2017 portrait of Prince Philip (1921–2021), the Prince Consort of Great Britain and the Duke of Edinburgh, by the Australian-British painter Ralph Heimans (b. 1970). It was created for the Museum of Danish History at Frederiksborg Castle in Denmark to mark Philip's retirement from royal public service and celebrate his Danish heritage.

Philip is depicted in the Grand Corridor at Windsor Castle donning the sash of the Order of the Elephant, Denmark's highest-ranking honor. Included in the portrait is a painting which depicts Queen Victoria and the Danish royal family, including Philip's 
mother Princess Alice of Battenberg as a young girl. Also shown at the end of the Grand Corridor is the entrance to the bedroom where Alice was born.

The Duke of Edinburgh had been a Danish prince but agreed to relinquish his foreign royal titles upon marrying Queen Elizabeth I of Great Britain and his assumption of the title HRH and role as the monarch's Prince Consort. It was the final official portrait of him executed during his lifetime.

References

2017 paintings
Portraits